Taylor County Airport  is a county-owned public-use airport located two nautical miles (4 km) northeast of the central business district of Campbellsville, a city in Taylor County, Kentucky, United States.

Although most U.S. airports use the same three-letter location identifier for the FAA and IATA, Taylor County Airport is assigned AAS by the FAA but has no designation from the IATA (which assigned AAS to Apalapsili Airport in Apalapsili, Indonesia).

Facilities and aircraft
It has one asphalt paved runway designated 5/23 which measures 5,003 x 75 feet (1,525 x 23 m). For the 12-month period ending May 19, 2006, the airport had 10,200 aircraft operations, an average of 27 per day: 75% general aviation, 16% air taxi and 9% military.

References

External links
 
 

Airports in Kentucky
Buildings and structures in Taylor County, Kentucky